Zio is a prefecture located in the Maritime Region of Togo. The prefecture seat is located in Tsévié.

Canton (administrative divisions) of Zio include Tsévié, Davié, Gblainvié, Dalavé, Kpomé, Gbatopé, Gapé-Centre, Bolou, Agbélouvé, Mission-Tové, Wli, Abobo, Kovié, Gamé-Sèva, Gapé-Kpodji, Djagblé, and Adétikopé .

References 

Prefectures of Togo
Maritime Region